The Vop is a river in Smolensk Oblast, Russia. It is a right tributary of the Dnieper. It is 158 km long, with a drainage basin of 3300 km². The average discharge is 22 m³/s.

The river was the site of intense combat operations in the Smolensk region in the period July–September, 1941 as part of Operation Barbarossa.

References

Rivers of Smolensk Oblast